The third season of The Bachelorette Australia premiered on Network Ten on 20 September 2017. The season features Sophie Monk, a 37-year-old model and radio personality from Gold Coast, Queensland, courting 22 men.

Contestants
The season began with 18 contestants. In episode 5, four "intruders" were brought into the competition, bringing the total number of contestants to 22.

Notes

Call-out order

Color Key

	
 The contestant received the Double Delight rose, granting them two single dates.
 The contestant received a rose during a date.
 The contestant was eliminated outside the rose ceremony.
 The contestant was eliminated during a date.
 The contestant was eliminated.
 The contestant quit the competition. 
 The contestant won the competition.

Episodes

Episode 1
Original airdate: 20 September 2017

Episode 2
Original airdate: 21 September 2017

Episode 3
Original airdate: 27 September 2017

Episode 4
Original airdate: 28 September 2017

Episode 5
Original airdate: 4 October 2017

Episode 6
Original airdate: 5 October 2017

Episode 7
Original airdate: 11 October 2017

Episode 8
Original airdate: 12 October 2017

Episode 9
Original airdate: 18 October 2017

Episode 10
Original airdate: 19 October 2017

Episode 11
Original airdate: 25 October 2017

Episode 12
Original airdate: 26 October 2017

Ratings

References

2017 Australian television seasons
2017 in Australian television
Australian (season 03)
Television shows filmed in Australia
Television shows filmed in Fiji